is a railway station in the town of   Kamiichi, Nakaniikawa District Toyama Prefecture , Japan, operated by the private railway operator Toyama Chihō Railway.

Lines

Station layout 
The station has two bay platform serving three tracks, with a three-story station building. The station is staffed.

Platforms

History
Kamiichi Station was opened on 15 August 1931.

Adjacent stations

Passenger statistics
In fiscal 2015, the station was used by 1813 passengers daily.

Surrounding area 
Kamiichi Tourist Information Center

See also
 List of railway stations in Japan

References

External links

 

Railway stations in Toyama Prefecture
Railway stations in Japan opened in 1931
Stations of Toyama Chihō Railway
Kamiichi, Toyama